Ángel León Gozalo (Villalón de Campos, Valladolid, 2 October 1907 – Madrid 10 August 1979) was a Spanish sport shooter. He competed at the 1948, 1952 and 1960 Olympics in the 50 m pistol event and finished in 6th, 2nd and 18th place, respectively. Léon Gozalo worked as a shooting instructor with the police in Madrid.

References

1907 births
1979 deaths
Spanish male sport shooters
ISSF pistol shooters
Olympic shooters of Spain
Shooters at the 1948 Summer Olympics
Shooters at the 1952 Summer Olympics
Shooters at the 1960 Summer Olympics
Olympic silver medalists for Spain
Olympic medalists in shooting
Medalists at the 1952 Summer Olympics
20th-century Spanish people